Gilles Dumas is a French rugby league football coach and former player. He is the coach of French Elite One Championship club, Saint-Gaudens Bears and previously Toulouse Olympique. He previously coached the French national team while coaching Saint Gaudens in the Elite 1 Championship in the 1990s and 2000s. Dumas was a France national representative goal-kicking , scrum- or stand-off half back in his playing days during the 1980s and 1990s.

Playing career
During the 1986 Kangaroo tour of Great Britain and France Dumas played for France in both Test matches against Australia, the first at fullback and the second from the bench. Playing as a scrum half but eventually settling into the  position, he continued representing France in matches for the 1989–92 World Cup tournament as well.

Coaching career
Dumas starting coaching the France national rugby league team in 1998. He coached the French in their campaign for the 2000 World Cup. Dumas was national coach for the 2001 French rugby league tour of New Zealand and Papua New Guinea. During the 2002 New Zealand rugby league tour of Great Britain and France he coached the France national team as they hosted the Kiwis. During the 2003 Kangaroo tour of Great Britain and France Dumas coached the France national team as they hosted the Australians.

References

Living people
Year of birth missing (living people)
Place of birth missing (living people)
France national rugby league team captains
France national rugby league team coaches
France national rugby league team players
French rugby league coaches
French rugby league players
Rugby league five-eighths
Rugby league fullbacks
Rugby league halfbacks
Saint-Gaudens Bears coaches
Saint-Gaudens Bears players
Sportspeople from Toulouse
Toulouse Olympique coaches